Orta Güneypəyə (also, Orta Guneypeye and Orta Guneypaya) is a village in the Agdam Rayon of Azerbaijan.

References 

Populated places in Aghdam District